I Shot Andy Warhol is a 1996 biographical drama film about the life of Valerie Solanas and her relationship with the artist Andy Warhol. The film marked the feature film directorial debut of Canadian director Mary Harron. The film stars Lili Taylor as Valerie, Jared Harris as Andy Warhol, and Martha Plimpton as Valerie's friend Stevie. Stephen Dorff plays Warhol superstar Candy Darling. John Cale of The Velvet Underground wrote the film's score despite protests from former band member Lou Reed. Yo La Tengo plays an anonymous band that is somewhat reminiscent of the group.

The film was screened in the Un Certain Regard section of the 1996 Cannes Film Festival. To celebrate the 30th anniversary of the Teddy Awards, the film was selected to be shown at the 66th Berlin International Film Festival in February 2016.

Plot
The film opens immediately after the shooting at The Factory in 1968, followed by Valerie Solanas being shown in custody for shooting Andy Warhol. The film then uses flashbacks to when Valerie was living in New York as a sex worker, then to her difficult childhood, then to her success in studying psychology at college. Here, Valerie discovers that she is a lesbian, that she can write, and that she has a distinctive view of the world. This leads her to New York City and its downtown underworld. Through her friend Stevie, she meets Candy Darling, who in turn introduces her to Warhol.

Valerie also meets Maurice Girodias, the publisher of Olympia Press. While Valerie wants Warhol to produce her play, Up Your Ass, Girodias wants her to write a pornographic novel for him. The group steals her manuscript and lies about it, saying it was lost. Once she signs a contract with Girodias, she comes to suspect his offer is not a generous one and may not be in her best interest. She comes to regret signing this contract. At this point, her increasing derangement leads her to believe that Warhol and Girodias are controlling her. The film concludes, where it began, with Solanas' attempted murder of Warhol. Warhol lives in fear that Valerie will strike again and never fully recovers from the shooting. The SCUM Manifesto becomes a feminist classic.

Cast

Background
Initially intended as a BBC documentary, the film was directed by Mary Harron who also co-wrote the screenplay with Daniel Minahan.

Dr. Dana Heller, Dean of Arts and Sciences at Eastern Michigan University, argues that the film stages the conflict between Solanas and Warhol as less the result of gender politics – particularly because Solanas intended no connection between her writing and the shooting – than of the decline of print culture as represented by Solanas and the rise of new non-writing media as embodied by Warhol and the pop art movement. In the screenplay, Harron and Minahan describe Solanas as "banging at an ancient typewriter" and the film frequently shows her typing, for which she is mocked by Warhol and other Factory regulars. Solanas' writing is set against the new technologies of reproduction championed by Warhol.

Many people who knew Solanas and Warhol tried to rationalize the shooting. Stephen Koch, who in 1973 wrote a study of Warhol's film, stated: "Valerie lives in terror of dependence: That is what the SCUM Manifesto is about, an absolute terror before the experience of need. Like Warhol, Solanas is obsessed with an image of autonomy, except that... she has played the obsession desperately, rather than with Warhol's famous cool."

Reception
Film review aggregator Rotten Tomatoes reported that 77% of critics gave the film positive reviews. On Metacritic it has a weighted score of 75/100, based on 20 critics, denoting "generally favorable reviews".

Awards and nominations

Wins
 Gijón International Film Festival Best Art Direction – Thérèse DePrez
 Seattle International Film Festival Golden Space Needle Award for Best Actress – Lili Taylor
 Stockholm Film Festival Award for Best Actress – Lili Taylor
 Sundance Film Festival Special Recognition for Outstanding Performance – Lili Taylor

Nominations
 Independent Spirit Awards Best First Feature – Mary Harron, Tom Kalin, and Christine Vachon
 Stockholm Film Festival Bronze Horse
 Sundance Film Festival Grand Jury Prize – Dramatic

Home media
I Shot Andy Warhol was released on Region 1 DVD on January 23, 2001.

Soundtrack

Additional songs from the film 
 "Walk On By" – Dionne Warwick
 "One Note Samba" – Antônio Carlos Jobim
 "The More I See You" – Chris Montez
 "Caro Nome (Gilda's Aria) from Rigoletto" – Daniela Lojarro
 "Grazing in the Grass" – Hugh Masekela
 "The Red Telephone" – Love
 "Summertime Blues" – Blue Cheer
 "Ain't Gonna Bump No More (With No Big Fat Woman)" – Joe Tex

References

Bibliography

External links
 
 
 
 
 

1996 films
1996 crime drama films
1996 directorial debut films
1996 independent films
1996 LGBT-related films
1990s biographical drama films
1990s feminist films
American biographical drama films
American crime drama films
American feminist films
American independent films
American LGBT-related films
British biographical drama films
British crime drama films
British feminist films
British independent films
British LGBT-related films
Crime films based on actual events
Cultural depictions of Andy Warhol
Cultural depictions of Valerie Solanas
1990s English-language films
Films about drugs
Films about writers
Films directed by Mary Harron
Films produced by Christine Vachon
Films scored by John Cale
Films set in the 1960s
British films set in New York City
Killer Films films
Lesbian-related films
LGBT-related drama films
LGBT-related films based on actual events
The Samuel Goldwyn Company films
Sundance Film Festival award winners
Transgender-related films
1990s American films
1990s British films